Kurt-Curry Axel Wegscheider (born 30 May 2001) is a Central African college basketball player who plays for the Lubbock Christian Chaparrals.

Early life
Wegscheider was born in Bangui to a German father of French origin, and his mother was a former professional basketball player in the Central African Republic. After playing association football first, Wegscheider picked up basketball at age five. At age 14, he joined the NBA Academy Africa in Senegal where he played five years. He also played in the Basketball Without Borders program and was named MVP of the all-star game.

College career
Starting from the 2019–20 season, Wegscheider joined the New Mexico program.

From 2021, he played for the USU Eastern, averaging 14.4 points and 4.3 rebounds in his first season with the Golden Eagles.

National team career
Wegscheider plays for the Central African Republic national basketball team, and represented his country at AfroBasket 2021.

References

External links
Lubbock Christian Chaparrals bio
Proballers profile

2001 births
Point guards
Central African Republic men's basketball players
People from Bangui
Living people
New Mexico Lobos men's basketball players
Utah State Eastern Golden Eagles men's basketball players
Lubbock Christian Chaparrals basketball